Phyllis W. Harmon (October 14, 1916 – August 26, 2016) was an American bicycle enthusiast.

The League of American Wheelmen (L.A.W.) 
The L.A.W., a national organization for cyclists, was founded in 1880 and actively defended the rights of cyclists until 1902, when the League became dormant. In the 1930s, Dick Wilson, a bicycle industry representative, invited members of the Evanston Bicycle Touring Club to become the first chapter of the inactive L.A.W. Harmon, age 19, joined and immediately began recruiting new members. After learning that three clubs could come together and form a council, she encouraged the Rambler Cycle Club and Oak Park Cycle Club to join with the Evanston club to become the first council in the League.
After the war, the proliferation of automobiles and narrow highways left little room on the roads for bicycles. Bicycling was no longer safe or fun, so the League became inactive again in 1955.

Harmon served the organization in every conceivable role as a volunteer, office staff, historian, treasurer, executive vice president, and interim executive director (a position she held for four years). She also served as editor of the League's monthly bulletin for more than thirty years.

Honors 
 In 1979, Harmon was awarded the Dr Paul Dudley White Award, the League of American Wheelmen's top national award, honoring individuals who are an "inspiration to others for his or her commitment to the future of bicycling and to significant progress in education, safety, rights, or benefits of bicycling".
 In 1985, the League of American Wheelmen established the Phyllis Harmon Volunteer of the Year Award to recognize individuals who have made extraordinary contributions to bicycling.
 In 2005, she was listed as number 12 in the League of American Bicyclists' Top 25 Change Agents for Cycling, honoring "25 people who indelibly changed the face of cycling in America."
 In 2006, Harmon was inducted into The Chicagoland Bicycle Federation Hall of Fame.
 In 2009, Harmon was inducted into the United States Bicycling Hall of Fame and was, at the time, the oldest living member.

References

External links
Phyllis Harmon: League of American Wheelmen (LAW) collection, 1880-2006, bulk 1965-1999, University Archives and Special Collections, Joseph P. Healey Library, University of Massachusetts Boston
"Remembering Phyllis Harmon, the Grande Dame of American Bicycling". League of American Bicyclists, Bicycle Friendly America Magazine, Winter 2017.

1916 births
2016 deaths
Cycling advocates
American female cyclists
Cyclists from Illinois